Stefan Ritter  (born ) is a Canadian male track cyclist, representing Canada at international competitions. He won the bronze medal at the 2016 Pan American Track Cycling Championships in the 1 km time trial and in the team sprint. Ritter is the 2016 UCI junior world champion in the 1 kilometre time trial.

Ritter suffered a serious head injury during the 2018 Pan American Track Cycling Championships in Mexico and was admitted to the ICU. The medical staff was optimistic that Ritter would make a full recovery.

References

External links

Stefan Ritter's official website

1998 births
Living people
Canadian male cyclists
Sportspeople from Edmonton
Canadian track cyclists
Cyclists at the 2018 Commonwealth Games
Commonwealth Games competitors for Canada